The 2015–16 1. FSV Mainz 05 II season is the 2nd consecutive season in the 3. Liga, having been promoted from the Regionalliga Südwest in 2014. The club's home stadium is the Stadion am Bruchweg, located in Mainz, Germany. The stadium has a capacity of 18,000 seats.

Background
In the club's previous season in the 3. Liga, they finished in 16th place, 3 points from the relegation zone.

Squad

On loan

Transfers

In

Out

Technical staff

Friendlies

Competitions

Overall

3. Liga

League table

Results summary

Results by round

Matches

References

Mainz 05 II, 1. FSV
1. FSV Mainz 05 II seasons